Jimmy the C is a 1977 animated short film, directed by Jimmy Picker and co-produced by Picker (going by James), Robert Grossman and Craig Whitaker. It was nominated for an Academy Award for Animated Short Film. The film was preserved by the Academy Film Archive in 2009.

Plot
The three-minute film features a clay-animated Jimmy Carter (who was U.S. President at the time) singing Georgia on My Mind, referencing his birth state. He is accompanied by a choir of Mr. Peanut lookalikes, and gazes at the moon at night. Ray Charles' rendition of the song is used on the soundtrack.

External links
 
 Pyramid Media

References

1970s American animated films
1977 films
1977 animated films
American animated short films
American political comedy films
American political satire films
American animated comedy films
Animated musical films
American satirical films
Films set in Georgia (U.S. state)
Clay animation films
Cultural depictions of Jimmy Carter
Ray Charles
1970s stop-motion animated films
1970s political comedy films
1977 short films